This list of people from Westport, Connecticut includes people who have been born in, raised in, lived in or who died in Westport, Connecticut, United States. Individuals are listed by the area in which they are best known.

Actors, comedians, others in the film and television industries

 Mason Adams (1919–2005), character and voice actor
 Millette Alexander (born 1933), actress, musician
 Mädchen Amick (born 1970), actress
 Linda Blair (born 1959), actress known for The Exorcist
 Scott Bryce (born 1958), actor
 Alisyn Camerota (born 1966), CNN newscaster
 Marilyn Chambers (1952–2009), porn star
 Imogene Coca (1908–2001), comedian 
 Kevin Conroy (1955-2022), actor
 Rodney Dangerfield (1921–2004), comedian and actor
 Bette Davis (1908–1989), Academy Award-winning actress
 Sandy Dennis (1937–1992), Academy Award-winning actress
 Phil Donahue (born 1935), television personality, talk show host, married to Marlo Thomas
 Michael Douglas (born 1944), Academy Award-winning actor
 Linda Fiorentino (born 1960), actress
 Cynthia Gibb (born 1963), actress
 Luke Greenfield (born 1972), movie director 
 Matt Harding (born 1976), Internet celebrity and video game designer
 Melissa Joan Hart (born 1976), actress
 Mariette Hartley (born 1940), actress
 Linda Hunt (born 1945), actress
 Mar Jennings (born 1975), television personality, author and philanthropist
 Patricia Kalember (born 1957), actress
 Brian Keane (born 1953), Emmy-winning composer
 Kerri Kenney-Silver (born 1970), actress, singer, writer and daughter of Larry Kenney
 Michael Kulich (1986–2016), pornographic film director and producer
 Paul Lieberstein (born 1967), writer and co-star of American version of The Office
 Christopher Lloyd (born 1938), actor and producer
 Bob Lorenz (born 1963), television sportscaster
 George Lowther (1913–1975), writer and producer for radio and television programs
 Pamela Sue Martin (born 1953), actress 
 Cady McClain (born 1969), soap opera actress
 Steve Miner (born 1951), film and television director
 Gerry Mulligan (1927–1996), jazz saxophonist, composer and arranger
 Paul Newman (1925–2008), Academy Award-winning actor, director, auto racer and philanthropist
 Justin Paul (born 1985), composer
 Alisan Porter (born 1981), actress (Curly Sue) and singer
 Robert Redford (born 1936), Academy Award-winning actor and director
 Eric Roberts (born 1956), actor
 Rod Serling (1924–1975), creator of The Twilight Zone 
 Micah Sloat (born 1981), actor and star of Paranormal Activity
 Brett Somers (1924–2007), actress, wife of Jack Klugman, game show personality
 Martha Stewart (born 1941), business magnate, television personality, author
 Marlo Thomas (born 1937), actress, author, wife of Phil Donahue
 Joanne Woodward (born 1930), Academy Award-winning actress and philanthropist

Singers, musicians and other entertainers

 Nickolas Ashford, singer 
 Michael Bolton, singer
 Chelsea Cutler, singer
 Matt Gallant (born 1964), television host 
 Mike Greenberg, ESPN personality, host of Mike and Mike
 Dan Hartman (1950–1994), singer, songwriter and record producer
 Don Imus, radio personality
 Charlie Karp, guitar player and songwriter
 Brian Keane, award-winning composer, producer, and guitarist
 Larry Kenney, radio personality on the Don Imus show, actor, father of Kerri Kenney-Silver
 Meat Loaf (Marvin Lee Aday), rock singer and songwriter
 Gerry Mulligan, Gerald Joseph "Gerry" Mulligan (1927–1996), jazz saxophonist, composer and arranger
 Nile Rodgers, musician and music producer
 Harry Rodrigues, DJ also known as Baauer
 Neil Sedaka, singer
 Neal Smith, drummer for Alice Cooper, Rock and Roll Hall of Fame inductee
 John Solum, flutist, author and teacher
 Martha Stewart, entrepreneur
 Eric Von Schmidt (1931–2007), folk and blues singer-songwriter
 Hy Zaret (1907–2007), lyricist

Artists, illustrators, cartoonists, designers

 Rudolph Belarski, illustrator, graphic artist, painter, art school instructor
 Mel Casson, cartoonist 
 Ann Chernow, artist
 Stevan Dohanos (1907–1994), artist and illustrator 
 Leonard Everett Fisher (born 1924), artist and illustrator
 Bernie Fuchs (1932–2009), renowned illustrator
 William Glackens (1870–1938), realist painter
 Hardie Gramatky (1907–1979), painter, author, and illustrator 
 Annie Leibovitz (born 1949), portrait photographer 
 Joe McNally, photographer
 T. O'Conor Sloane Jr. (1879–1963), photographer
 Curt Swan (1920–1996), comics artist
 Gerry Turner (1921–1982), photographer and writer of children's books
 Edward Vebell (1921–2018), illustrator
 Hilla von Rebay (1890–1967), painter and founding curator of the Solomon R. Guggenheim Museum
 George Hand Wright (1872–1951), painter and illustrator

Athletes, sportspeople 

 John DiBartolomeo (born 1991), American-Israeli basketball player for Maccabi Tel Aviv of the Israeli Basketball Premier League
 Shayne Gostisbehere (born 1993), NHL Player for the Arizona Coyotes
 Parker Kligerman (born 1990), NASCAR driver
 Skip Lane (born 1960), football player
 Julia Marino (born 1997), snowboarder
 Kyle Martino (born 1981), soccer player 
 Jim McKay (1921–2008), Emmy award-winning sports commentator 
 Charlie Reiter (born 1988), soccer player
 Julius Seligson (1909–1987), tennis player
 Kyle Zajec (born 1997), soccer player

Authors, writers, journalists

 Lynsey Addario (born 1973), journalist, freelance photographer
 Lincoln Child (born 1957), author of techno-thriller and horror novels
 Frank Deford (1938-2017), journalist, writer and commentator
 Peter De Vries (1910–1993), editor and novelist
 F. Scott Fitzgerald (1896–1940), author of The Great Gatsby
 Ramin Ganeshram (born 1968), journalist, chef, author
 Hardie Gramatky (1907–1979), author, artist, illustrator 
 Jane Green (born 1968), also known as Jane Green Warburg, author
 Tyler Hicks (born 1969), journalist, staff photographer, The New York Times
 A.E. Hotchner, author and co-founder with Paul Newman of Newman's Own brands
 Shirley Jackson (1916–1965), novelist
 Mar Jennings (born 1975), author 
 Gordon Joseloff (1945–2020), former First Selectman and Emmy Award-winning journalist
 Melissa Kirsch (born 1974), author 
 Hilton Kramer (1928–2012), editor and art critic
 Ruth Krauss (1901–1993), author of children's books 
 Nora Benjamin Kubie (1899–1988), author and illustrator of children's books
 Robert Lawson (1892–1957), author and artist of children's books 
 Robert Ludlum, author 
 Sheila Lukins (1942–2009), cook and food writer
 Jim Nantz, CBS Sports
 Jeff Pegues, CBS News Justice and Homeland Security Correspondent; author 
 David Pogue, New York Times technology columnist
 Harry Reasoner (1923–1991), news anchor 
 Ronald B. Scott, journalist, biographer and author 
 T. O'Conor Sloane III (1912–2003), Doubleday editor 
 Jack Tippit, cartoonist 
 Gerry Turner, author of children's books and photographer 
 Max Wilk (1920–2011), author
 Jane Yolen, author

Government and politics, officeholders, activists and business people

 James Comey (born 1960), Deputy Attorney General and FBI Director
 Wilbur Lucius Cross (1862–1948), Governor of Connecticut
 Ray Dalio, CEO, money manager at Bridgewater Associates
 William Phelps Eno (1858–1945), inventor of the stop sign and traffic innovator
 Rajat Gupta (born 1948), CEO of McKinsey & Company convicted of insider trading
 Henry M. Judah, Civil War brigadier general
 Arnie Kaye, owner of a famous town arcade 
 John Davis Lodge (1903–1985), Connecticut Governor and Congressman
 Frederick M. Salmon (1870–1936), Connecticut State Comptroller
 James K. Scribner, member of the Wisconsin State Assembly
 Lillian Wald (1867–1940), nurse and humanitarian activist
 Anne Wexler (1930–2009), political advisor and lobbyist

Scientists

 John William Fyfe, physician who practiced eclectic medicine
 Mariangela Lisanti, theoretical physicist
 Mary Loveless, immunologist who developed a bee sting immunity
 John B. Watson (1878–1958), psychologist who established the school of behaviorism

See also
 List of people from Connecticut
 List of people from Bridgeport, Connecticut
 List of people from Brookfield, Connecticut
 List of people from Darien, Connecticut
 List of people from Greenwich, Connecticut
 List of people from Hartford, Connecticut
 List of people from New Canaan, Connecticut
 List of people from New Haven, Connecticut
 List of people from Norwalk, Connecticut
 List of people from Redding, Connecticut
 List of people from Ridgefield, Connecticut
 List of people from Stamford, Connecticut

References

External links 
 

Westport, Connecticut
Westport Connecticut